Fausto Francisco Klinger (born 15 April 1953) is an Ecuadorian former international footballer who played for Deportivo Cuenca and Barcelona SC as a defender.

Born in Esmeraldas, Klinger played as a full-back. He won the Ecuadorian league four times with Barcelona SC.

References

1953 births
Living people
Ecuadorian footballers
Ecuador international footballers
C.D. Cuenca footballers
Barcelona S.C. footballers
Association football defenders